Shaylee Bent (born 13 September 2000) is an Australian rugby league footballer who plays as a er for the St George Illawarra Dragons in the NRL Women's Premiership and the Tweed Heads Seagulls in the QRL Women's Premiership. 

She is a New South Wales, Indigenous All Stars and Australian 9s representative.

Background
Born in Penrith, New South Wales, Bent is of Indigenous Australian and Greek descent. At age 15, Bent began playing rugby league for the Glenmore Park Brumbies.

Playing career
In 2017, she played for the Parramatta Eels in the Tarsha Gale Cup. In 2018, she moved to the Wests Tigers Tarsha Gale Cup side. 

After the Tarsha Gale Cup season, Bent joined Mounties in the NSWRL Women's Premiership. Where she started as centre in the grand final victory over South Sydney 12-10.

2019
In May 2019, she represented NSW City at the NRL Women's National Championships. In July, she was 18th player for the New South Wales side.

In Round 1 of the 2019 NRL Women's season, Bent made her debut for the St George Illawarra Dragons in a 4–14 loss to the Brisbane Broncos. Later that month, she represented Australia at the 2019 Rugby League World Cup 9s.

2020
In 2020, she played for the South Sydney Rabbitohs in the NSWRL Women's Premiership.

On 17 October, she was named the Dragons' NRLW Player of the Year.

2021
In 2021, Bent joined the Tweed Heads Seagulls in the QRL Women's Premiership. On 20 February, she represented the Indigenous All Stars in their 24–0 loss to the Māori All Stars.

Achievements and accolades

Individual
St George Illawarra Dragons Player of the Year: 2020

References

External links
St George Illawarra Dragons profile

1999 births
Living people
Australian people of Greek descent
Indigenous Australian rugby league players
Australian female rugby league players
Rugby league players from Penrith, New South Wales
Rugby league second-rows
St. George Illawarra Dragons (NRLW) players